The 2014 U.S. House of Representatives elections in Michigan were held on Tuesday, November 4, 2014, to elect the 14 members of the U.S. House of Representatives from the state of Michigan, one from each of the state's 14 congressional districts. The elections coincided with the elections of other federal and state offices, including the election of Michigan's governor, as well as the Class 2 U.S. Senate Seat.

Primary elections to determine major party nominees for the general election were held Tuesday, August 5, 2014, and the partisan filing deadline was Tuesday, April 22, 2014. The members of Congress elected at this election served in the 114th Congress.

According to the Rothenberg Political Report, all of Michigan's congressional seats except for the 1st, 7th, 8th and 11th districts were considered "safe" for the party of the incumbent.

Overview

District
Results of the 2014 United States House of Representatives elections in Michigan by district:

District 1

The 1st district includes the entire Upper Peninsula of Michigan and part of the Lower Peninsula. The district, which makes up about 44% of the land area of the state of Michigan, is the second-largest congressional district east of the Mississippi River by land area. The incumbent is Republican Dan Benishek, who has represented the district since 2011. He was re-elected with 48% of the vote in 2012 and the district has a PVI of R+5.

Benishek was re-elected in 2012 with 48.14% of the total votes cast, defeating Democratic former State Representative Gary McDowell by less than 2,000 votes in a field where two third-party candidates received a combined 4.3 percent of the vote. As of September 30, 2013, Benishek had raised $676,545.98, and has $500,163.86 cash on-hand toward a presumed re-election bid.

Republican primary

Candidates

Nominee
 Dan Benishek, incumbent U.S. Representative

Eliminated in primary
 Alan Arcand, businessman, United States Air Force veteran and delegate to the 2012 Republican National Convention

Results

Democratic primary
Former Kalkaska County Sheriff Jerry Cannon was recruited by Michigan Democratic Party Chairman Lon Johnson to challenge Benishek.

Candidates

Nominee
 Jerry Cannon, retired Michigan Army National Guard Major General and former Kalkaska County Sheriff

Failed to qualify
 Kevin Glover

Declined
Gary McDowell, former state representative and nominee for this seat in 2010 & 2012

Results

General election

Endorsements

Predictions

Results

District 2

The 2nd district is located in West Michigan. The incumbent is Republican Bill Huizenga, who has represented the district since 2011. He was re-elected with 61% of the vote in 2012 and the district has a PVI of R+7.

As of September 30, 2013, Huizenga had raised $537,109.30 for the 2014 election cycle, and has $402,388.39 cash on-hand available toward a presumed re-election bid.

Republican primary

Candidates

Nominee
 Bill Huizenga, incumbent U.S. Representative

Results

Democratic primary

Candidates

Nominee
 Dean Vanderstelt, retired business executive

Results

General election

Endorsements

Results

District 3

The 3rd district is located in West Michigan. The incumbent is Republican Justin Amash, who has represented the district since 2011. He was re-elected with 53% of the vote in 2012 and the district has a PVI of R+4.

As of September 30, 2013, Amash had raised $555,863.56 for the 2014 election cycle, and has $313,844.71 cash on-hand available toward a presumed re-election bid. In September 2013, Amash ended months of speculation regarding whether he would run for the U.S. Senate seat being vacated by Carl Levin, choosing instead to run for re-election to his House seat. Amash faced a primary challenge from investment manager Brian Ellis. Amash defeated Ellis in the Republican primary.

Republican primary

Candidates

Nominee
 Justin Amash, incumbent U.S. Representative

Eliminated in primary
 Brian Ellis, investment manager

Declined
 Mark Jansen, state senator

Polling

Results

Democratic primary

Candidates

Nominee
 Bob Goodrich, president and CEO of Goodrich Quality Theaters

Failed to qualify
 Richard A. Abbott

Results

General election

Endorsements

Results

District 4

The 4th district is located in Northern and Central Michigan. The incumbent is Republican Dave Camp, who has represented the district since 1993 and previously represented the 10th district from 1991 to 1993. He was re-elected with 63% of the vote in 2012 and the district has a PVI of R+5.

As of September 30, 2013, Camp has raised $1,607,226.02 for the 2014 election cycle, and has $3,198,099.13 cash on-hand available for a presumed re-election bid. In July 2013, Camp announced he was considering running for the U.S. Senate to replace the retiring incumbent Carl Levin, but then the following month announced that he will not do so. In March 2014, he announced that he would not run for re-election. State senator John Moolenaar was the winner of the Republican primary.

Republican primary

Candidates

Nominee
 John Moolenaar, state senator

Eliminated in primary
 Peter Konetchy, software business owner
 Paul Mitchell, businessman and Finance Chairman of the Michigan Republican Party

Declined
 Darwin L. Booher, state senator
 Brian Calley, Lieutenant Governor of Michigan (running for re-election)
 Dave Camp, incumbent U.S. Representative
 Gary Glenn, conservative activist and candidate for the U.S. Senate in 2012
 Roger Kahn, state senator
 Bill Schuette, Michigan Attorney General (running for re-election)
 Jim Stamas, Majority Leader of the Michigan House of Representatives (running for the state senate)

Polling

Results

Democratic primary

Candidates

Nominee
 Jeff Holmes, physician

Withdrawn
 John Barker, former Union Township Supervisor

Declined
 James A. Barcia, former U.S. Representative
 Bill Federspiel, Saginaw County Sheriff
 Tom Hickner, Bay County Executive
 Dale Sheltrown, former State Representative
 Joel Sheltrown, former State Representative

Results

General election

Endorsements

Predictions

Results

District 5

The 5th district is located in Central Michigan. The incumbent is Democrat Dan Kildee, who has represented the district since 2013. He was elected with 65% of the vote in 2012, succeeding his uncle, Democrat Dale Kildee. The district has a PVI of D+10.

As of September 30, 2013, Kildee has raised $243,246.99 for the 2014 election cycle, and has $210,492.27 cash on-hand available for his re-election bid. He was unopposed in the August primary and will face Republican nominee Allen Hardwick in November.

Democratic primary

Candidates

Nominee
 Dan Kildee, incumbent U.S. Representative

Results

Republican primary

Candidates

Nominee
 Allen Hardwick, computer repairman

Eliminated in primary
 Tom Whitmire, health consultant

Results

General election

Endorsements

Results

District 6

The 6th district is located in Southwest Michigan. The incumbent is Republican Fred Upton, who has represented the district since 1993 and previously represented the 4th district from 1987 to 1993. He was re-elected with 55% of the vote in 2012 and the district has a PVI of R+1.

As of September 30, 2013, Upton had raised $1,205,296.00 for the 2014 election cycle, and has $893,110.90 cash on-hand available for a presumed re-election bid. Upton was challenged for the Republican primary nomination by registered nurse Jim Bussler. 

Paul Clements, a professor at Western Michigan University, is running for the Democratic nomination. Upton won the Republican nomination/

Republican primary

Candidates

Nominee
 Fred Upton, incumbent U.S. Representative

Eliminated in primary
 Jim Bussler, registered nurse

Results

Democratic primary

Candidates

Nominee
 Paul Clements, political science professor

Results

General election

Campaign
Upton's relatively disappointing performance in 2012 (winning with 55%, the smallest margin of his career, after outspending his opponent $4 million to $294,000), Clements' strong fundraising and outside spending on behalf of Clements has prompted speculation that Upton could suffer an upset loss. Even a close win for Upton could persuade him to retire, as happened to Republican Charles E. Chamberlain, who only narrowly defeated Democrat Milton Robert Carr in 1972, retiring in 1974 to be succeeded by Carr.

Endorsements

Polling

Predictions

Results

District 7

The 7th district is located in Southern Michigan. The incumbent is Republican Tim Walberg, who has represented the district since 2011 and previously represented the district from 2007 to 2009. He was re-elected with 53% of the vote in 2012 and the district has a PVI of R+3.

As of September 30, 2013, Walberg had raised $482,372.42, and has $570,160.47 cash on-hand available for a presumed re-election bid.

Attorney and former state representative Pam Byrnes was recruited by Michigan Democratic Party chairman Lon Johnson to challenge Walberg. The Rothenberg Political Report rates this race as "Republican Favored." Walberg won the Republican nomination.

Republican primary

Candidates

Nominee
 Tim Walberg, incumbent U.S. Representative

Eliminated in primary
 Douglas Radcliffe North

Results

Democratic primary

Candidates

Nominee
 Pam Byrnes, former state representative

Results

General election

Endorsements

Polling

Predictions

Results

District 8

The 8th district is located in Southern and Southeast Michigan. The incumbent is Republican Mike Rogers, who has represented the district since 2001. He was re-elected with 59% of the vote in 2012 and the district has a PVI of R+2.

As of September 30, 2013, Rogers had raised $869,321.02, and has $1,819,857.21 cash on-hand available for a presumed re-election bid. Rogers had considering running for the U.S. Senate, but ultimately declined, before deciding to not to seek re-election. 

Rogers' retirement made the formerly "Safe Republican" district more competitive. The Rothenberg Political Report now rates this race "Republican Favored" and The Washington Post predicts a "scramble" in the race to win the seat. Mike Bishop won the Republican nomination and Eric Schertzing won the Democratic nomination to fill Camp's seat.

Republican primary

Candidates

Nominee
 Mike Bishop, former Majority Leader of the Michigan Senate and nominee for Prosecutor of Oakland County in 2012

Eliminated in primary
 Tom McMillin, state representative

Withdrawn
 Bryan Barnett, Mayor of Rochester Hills

Declined
 Saul Anuzis, former chairman of the Michigan Republican Party and candidate for chairman of the Republican National Committee in 2009 and 2011
 Mike Bouchard, Oakland County Sheriff, former state senator, nominee for the U.S. Senate in 2006 and candidate for Governor in 2010
 Cindy Denby, state representative
 Craig DeRoche, former Speaker of the Michigan House of Representatives
 Gail Haines, State Representative
 Joe Hune, state senator
 Rick Jones, State Senator and former Eaton County Sheriff
 Jim Marleau, State Senator
 Bill Rogers, state representative and older brother of Mike Rogers
 Mike Rogers, incumbent U.S. Representative

Endorsements

Polling

Results

Democratic primary

Candidates

Nominee
 Eric Schertzing, Ingham County Treasurer

Eliminated in primary
 Ken Darga, former state demographer
 Jeffrey Hank, attorney
 Susan Grettenberger, associate professor and director of social work at Central Michigan University

Declined
 Bob Alexander, activist and nominee for this seat in 2004 and 2008
 Virgil Bernero, Mayor of Lansing and nominee for Governor of Michigan in 2010
 Barb Byrum, Ingham County Clerk and former state representative
 Dianne Byrum, member of the Michigan State University board of trustees, former state representative, former state senator and nominee for the seat in 2000
 Mark Meadows, former state representative and former mayor of East Lansing
 Sam Singh, state representative and former mayor of East Lansing
 Peter Spadafore, President of the Lansing Board of Education
 Gretchen Whitmer, Minority Leader of the Michigan Senate

Results

General election

Endorsements

Polling

Predictions

Results

District 9

The 9th district is located in Southeast Michigan. The incumbent is Democrat Sander Levin, who has represented the district since 2013 and previously represented the 12th district from 1993 to 2013 and the 17th district from 1983 to 1993. He was re-elected with 62% of the vote in 2012 and the district has a PVI of D+6.

As of September 30, 2013, Levin had raised $620,167.36, and has $347,066.37 cash on-hand available for a presumed re-election bid.

Democratic primary

Candidates

Nominee
 Sander Levin, incumbent U.S. Representative

Results

Republican primary

Candidates

Nominee
 George Brikho

Withdrawn
 Greg Dildilian (running for the state house)

Results

General election

Campaign
Republican candidate George Brikho caused controversy during the campaign, by suggesting Adolf Hitler was a better leader than Hillary Clinton.

Endorsements

Results

District 10

The 10th district is located an area of the Lower Peninsula of Michigan known as The Thumb. The incumbent is Republican Candice Miller, who has represented the district since 2003. She was re-elected with 69% of the vote in 2012 and the district has a PVI of R+6.

As of September 30, 2013, Miller had raised $395,759.26, and has $995,281.27 cash on-hand available for a presumed re-election bid. Miller declined an opportunity to run for the U.S. Senate seat being vacated by Carl Levin, declaring her intention to seek re-election instead.

Republican primary

Candidates

Nominee
 Candice Miller, incumbent U.S. Representative

Failed to qualify
 Don Volaric

Results

Democratic primary

Candidates

Nominee
 Chuck Stadler, accountant and nominee for this seat in 2012

Results

General election

Results

District 11

The 11th district is located northwest of Detroit. The incumbent is Republican Kerry Bentivolio, who has represented the district since 2013. He was elected in 2012, winning the general election with 51% of the vote but losing the special election to fill the final few weeks of Republican Thaddeus McCotter's term. The district has a PVI of R+4.

The Rothenberg Political Report rated this race "Republican Favored."

Republican primary
As of September 30, 2013, Bentivolio had raised $165,479.93, and has $38,677.61 cash on-hand available for a presumed re-election bid. Foreclosure attorney David Trott, a major campaign donor for Mitt Romney's 2012 presidential campaign and a close friend to Oakland County Executive L. Brooks Patterson, is challenging Bentivolio in the Republican primary. As of September 30, 2013, Trott had raised $647,719.32, and has $452,421.31 cash on-hand available for his primary challenge. First quarter, 2014 Federal Election Commission filings show Trott self-funded his campaign with over $800,000 while acquiring approximately $850,000 from donors. FEC filings by Rep. Kerry Bentivolio indicate he has raised approximately $440,000 from donors.

Candidates

Nominee
 David Trott, foreclosure attorney

Eliminated in primary
 Kerry Bentivolio, incumbent U.S. Representative

Endorsements

Polling

Results

After his defeat, Bentivolio announced that he was running a write-in campaign. He alleged that after Trott won the primary, the Trott campaign "kept up the attacks, but they expanded it beyond me. After they won the race, they continued to beat up me, my family members, as well as my staff... I put them on notice: If they didn't stop I'm probably going to end up doing a write-in campaign. And they didn't stop." The Trott campaign has denied this, saying that "nothing like that occurred." Bentivolio does not think he will win, or even "get enough votes to keep [Trott] from getting elected... all I'm concerned about is getting people who want a voice through a protest vote to do a protest vote."

Democratic primary
Robert L. McKenzie who had worked for the United States Department of State as senior advisor, was the Democratic Party nominee. Jocelyn Benson, the Dean of Wayne State University Law School, was considering running for the seat but declined to do so in the wake of the murder of a student at Wayne State University. Michigan Democratic Party Chairman Lon Johnson said the party will field a top caliber opponent against the Republican nominee. 

McKenzie would win the Democratic nomination.

Candidates

Nominee
 Bobby McKenzie, counter-terrorism specialist

Eliminated in primary
 Anil Kumar, physician
 Bill Roberts
 Nancy Skinner, radio host, candidate for the U.S. Senate from Illinois in 2004 and nominee for Michigan's 9th congressional district in 2006

Declined
 Jocelyn Benson, Dean of Wayne State University Law School and nominee for Michigan Secretary of State in 2010

Polling

Results

General election

Endorsements

Polling

Predictions

Results

District 12

The 12th district is located between Detroit's western suburbs and Ann Arbor. The incumbent is Democrat John Dingell, who had represented the district since 2013 and previously represented the 15th district from 2003 to 2013, the 16th district from 1965 to 2003 and the 15th district from 1955 to 1965. He was re-elected with 68% of the vote in 2012 and the district had a PVI of D+15.

As of September 30, 2013, he had raised $299,148.00 and had $337,402.23 cash on-hand, but eventually chose to not seek re-election. His wife, Deborah Dingell, ran for the seat instead. She defeated Raymond Mullins for the Democratic nomination, and went on to defeat Terry Bowman in the general election. Upon her election she became the first person in history to succeed a living spouse in Congress.

Democratic primary

Candidates

Nominee
 Deborah Dingell, Member of the Wayne State University Board of Governors

Eliminated in primary
 Raymond Mullins

Declined
 John Dingell, incumbent U.S. Representative
 Lynn N. Rivers, former U.S. Representative
 Rebekah Warren, state senator

Polling

Results

Republican primary

Candidates

Nominee
 Terry Bowman

Withdrawn
 Stephen Farkas

Results

General election

Endorsements

Results

District 13

The 13th district is located in Wayne County and includes much of the city of Detroit. The incumbent is Democrat John Conyers, who has represented the district since 2013 and previously represented the 14th district from 1993 to 2013 and the 1st district from 1965 to 1993. He was re-elected with 83% of the vote in 2012 and the district has a PVI of D+34.

As of September 30, 2013, Conyers had raised $266,996.51, and has $132,515.29 cash on-hand available for a presumed re-election bid.

Democratic primary
The Wayne County Clerk determined that Conyers did not supply enough valid signatures to make the primary ballot. Conyers could of either appealed or ran as a write-in candidate. While the Michigan Secretary of State confirmed the ruling, a federal judge ordered Conyers' name back on the ballot. Conyers defeated Horace Sheffield III for the Democratic nomination.

Candidates

Nominee
 John Conyers, incumbent U.S. Representative

Eliminated in primary
 Horace Sheffield III, pastor of the New Destiny Christian Fellowship Church

Results

Republican primary

Candidates

Nominee
 Jeff Gorman, Retired Naval Officer & Commercial Airline Pilot.

Results

General election

Endorsements

Results

District 14

The 14th district stretches from eastern Detroit westward to Farmington Hills, then north to the suburbs of Auburn Hills. The incumbent is Democrat Gary Peters, who has represented the district since 2013 and previously represented the 9th district from 2009 to 2013. He was re-elected with 82% of the vote in 2012 and the district has a PVI of D+29.

Peters is not running for re-election, he is instead running for the United States Senate seat being vacated by retiring Democrat Carl Levin in 2014.

Brenda Lawrence won the Democratic primary on August 5, 2014.

Christina Conyers was the only filed Republican candidate for the GOP primary.

Democratic primary

Candidates

Nominee
 Brenda Lawrence, Mayor of Southfield, nominee for Oakland County Executive in 2008, for lieutenant governor in 2010 and candidate for this seat in 2012

Eliminated in primary
 Hansen Clarke, former U.S. Representative
 Burgess Foster
 Rudy Hobbs, state representative

Withdrawn
 Godfrey Dillard, attorney (running for Secretary of State)
 Stephen Dunwoody
 MyKale L. "Kelly" Garrett, Lathrup Village City Councilwoman (running for state representative)
 Vincent Gregory, state senator (running for re-election)
 Bert Johnson, state senator (running for re-election)
 Jessica Lynn McCall, former staffer for Jennifer Granholm and former Department of Health and Human Services employee
 Maurice Morton, attorney and businessman

Declined
 Gary Peters, incumbent U.S. Representative (running for the U.S. Senate)

Polling

Results

Republican primary

Candidates

Nominee
 Christina Conyers (withdrew after primary win)

Results

Replacement Nominee
 Christina Barr

General election

Endorsements

Results

See also
 2014 United States House of Representatives elections
 2014 United States elections

References

External links
U.S. House elections in Michigan, 2014 at Ballotpedia
Campaign contributions at OpenSecrets

Michigan
2014
United States House of Representatives